In mathematics, a rational number is a number that can be expressed as the quotient or fraction  of two integers, a numerator  and a non-zero denominator . For example,  is a rational number, as is every integer (e.g. ). The set of all rational numbers, also referred to as "the rationals", the field of rationals or the field of rational numbers is usually denoted by boldface , or blackboard bold 

A rational number is a real number. This statement is true not only in base 10, but also in every other integer base, such as the binary and hexadecimal ones (see ).

A real number that is not rational is called irrational. Since the set of rational numbers is countable, and the set of real numbers is uncountable, almost all real numbers are irrational.

 

Rational numbers together with addition and multiplication form a field which contains the integers, and is contained in any field containing the integers. In other words, the field of rational numbers is a prime field, and a field has characteristic zero if and only if it contains the rational numbers as a subfield.

In mathematical analysis, the rational numbers form a dense subset of the real numbers. The real numbers can be constructed from the rational numbers by completion, using Cauchy sequences, Dedekind cuts, or infinite decimals (see Construction of the real numbers).

Terminology
The term rational in reference to the set  refers to the fact that a rational number represents a ratio of two integers. In mathematics, "rational" is often used as a noun abbreviating "rational number". The adjective rational sometimes means that the coefficients are rational numbers. For example, a rational point is a point with rational coordinates (i.e., a point whose coordinates are rational numbers); a rational matrix is a matrix of rational numbers; a rational polynomial may be a polynomial with rational coefficients, although the term "polynomial over the rationals" is generally preferred, to avoid confusion between "rational expression" and "rational function" (a polynomial is a rational expression and defines a rational function, even if its coefficients are not rational numbers). However, a rational curve is not a curve defined over the rationals, but a curve which can be parameterized by rational functions.

Etymology

Although nowadays rational numbers are defined in terms of ratios, the term rational is not a derivation of ratio. On the contrary, it is ratio that is derived from rational: the first use of ratio with its modern meaning was attested in English about 1660, while the use of rational for qualifying numbers appeared almost a century earlier, in 1570. This meaning of rational came from the mathematical meaning of irrational, which was first used in 1551, and it was used in "translations of Euclid (following his peculiar use of )".

This unusual history originated in the fact that ancient Greeks "avoided heresy by forbidding themselves from thinking of those [irrational] lengths as numbers". So such lengths were irrational, in the sense of illogical, that is "not to be spoken about" ( in Greek).

This etymology is similar to that of imaginary numbers and real numbers.

Arithmetic

Irreducible fraction
This is often called the canonical form of the rational number.

Embedding of integers
Any integer  can be expressed as the rational number  which is its canonical form as a rational number.

Equality
 if and only if 

If both fractions are in canonical form, then: 
 if and only if  and

Ordering
If both denominators are positive (particularly if both fractions are in canonical form):
 if and only if 

On the other hand, if either denominator is negative, then each fraction with a negative denominator must first be converted into an equivalent form with a positive denominator—by changing the signs of both its numerator and denominator.

Addition
Two fractions are added as follows:

If both fractions are in canonical form, the result is in canonical form if and only if  are coprime integers.

Subtraction

If both fractions are in canonical form, the result is in canonical form if and only if  are coprime integers.

Multiplication
The rule for multiplication is:

where the result may be a reducible fraction—even if both original fractions are in canonical form.

Inverse
Every rational number  has an additive inverse, often called its opposite,

If  is in canonical form, the same is true for its opposite.

A nonzero rational number  has a multiplicative inverse, also called its reciprocal,

Division
If  are nonzero, the division rule is 

Exponentiation to integer power
If  is a non-negative integer, then

The result is in canonical form if the same is true for  In particular, 

If , then

Otherwise, the canonical form of the result is

Continued fraction representation

A finite continued fraction is an expression such as

where  are integers.

Other representations 

 common fraction: 
 mixed numeral: 
 repeating decimal using a vinculum: 
 repeating decimal using parentheses: 
 continued fraction using traditional typography: 
 continued fraction in abbreviated notation: 
 Egyptian fraction: 
 prime power decomposition: 
 quote notation: 

are different ways to represent the same rational value.

Formal construction

The rational numbers may be built as equivalence classes of ordered pairs of integers.

More precisely, let  be the set of the pairs  of integers such . An equivalence relation is defined on this set by 
 

Addition and multiplication can be defined by the following rules:

This equivalence relation is a congruence relation, which means that it is compatible with the addition and multiplication defined above; the set of rational numbers  is the defined as the quotient set by this equivalence relation,  equipped with the addition and the multiplication induced by the above operations. (This construction can be carried out with any integral domain and produces its field of fractions.)

The equivalence class of a pair  is denoted   
Two pairs  and  belong to the same equivalence class (that is are equivalent) if and only if 
 
This means that 

if and only if

Every equivalence class  may be represented by infinitely many pairs, since

Each equivalence class contains a unique canonical representative element. It is called the representation in lowest terms of the rational number.

The integers may be considered to be rational numbers identifying the integer  with the rational number 

A total order may be defined on the rational numbers, that extends the natural order of the integers. One has

If

Properties 
The set  of all rational numbers, together with the addition and multiplication operations shown above, forms a field.

 has no field automorphism other than the identity. (A field automorphism must fix 0 and 1; as it must fix the sum and the difference  of two fixed elements, it must fix every integer; as it must fix the quotient of two fixed elements, it must fix every rational number, and is thus the identity.)

 is a prime field, which is a field that has no subfield other than itself. The rationals are the smallest field with characteristic zero. Every field of characteristic zero contains a unique subfield isomorphic to 

With the order defined above,  is an ordered field that has no subfield other than itself, and is the smallest ordered field, in the sense that every ordered field contains a unique subfield isomorphic to 

 is the field of fractions of the integers  The algebraic closure of  i.e. the field of roots of rational polynomials, is the field of algebraic numbers.

The rationals are a densely ordered set: between any two rationals, there sits another one, and, therefore, infinitely many other ones. For example, for any two fractions such that 

(where  are positive), we have

Any totally ordered set which is countable, dense (in the above sense), and has no least or greatest element is order isomorphic to the rational numbers.

Countability 

The set of all rational numbers is countable, as is illustrated in the figure to the right. As a rational number can be expressed as a ratio of two integers, it is possible to assign two integers to any point on a square lattice as in a Cartesian coordinate system, such that any grid point corresponds to a rational number. This method, however, exhibits a form of redundancy, as several different grid points will correspond to the same rational number; these are highlighted in red on the provided graphic. An obvious example can be seen in the line going diagonally towards the bottom right; such ratios will always equal 1, as any non-zero number divided by itself will always equal one.

It is possible to generate all of the rational numbers without such redundancies: examples include the Calkin–Wilf tree and Stern–Brocot tree.

As the set of all rational numbers is countable, and the set of all real numbers (as well as the set of irrational numbers) is uncountable, the set of rational numbers is a null set, that is, almost all real numbers are irrational, in the sense of Lebesgue measure.

Real numbers and topological properties
The rationals are a dense subset of the real numbers; every real number has rational numbers arbitrarily close to it. A related property is that rational numbers are the only numbers with finite expansions as regular continued fractions.

In the usual topology of the real numbers, the rationals are neither an open set nor a closed set.

By virtue of their order, the rationals carry an order topology. The rational numbers, as a subspace of the real numbers, also carry a subspace topology. The rational numbers form a metric space by using the absolute difference metric  and this yields a third topology on  All three topologies coincide and turn the rationals into a topological field. The rational numbers are an important example of a space which is not locally compact. The rationals are characterized topologically as the unique countable metrizable space without isolated points. The space is also totally disconnected.

p-adic numbers

In addition to the absolute value metric mentioned above, there are other metrics which turn  into a topological field:

Let  be a prime number and for any non-zero integer , let  where  is the highest power of  dividing .

In addition set  For any rational number  we set 

Then 

defines a metric on 

The metric space  is not complete, and its completion is the -adic number field  Ostrowski's theorem states that any non-trivial absolute value on the rational numbers  is equivalent to either the usual real absolute value or a -adic absolute value.

See also
Dyadic rational
Floating point
Ford circles
Gaussian rational
Naive height—height of a rational number in lowest term
Niven's theorem
Rational data type
Divine Proportions: Rational Trigonometry to Universal Geometry

References

External links

 
"Rational Number" From MathWorld – A Wolfram Web Resource

Elementary mathematics
Field (mathematics)
Fractions (mathematics)
 
Sets of real numbers